Gunsight Lake is located in Glacier National Park, in the U.S. state of Montana. The lake is surrounded by high peaks including Fusillade Mountain to the north and Gunsight Mountain to the west.

See also
List of lakes in Glacier County, Montana

References

Lakes of Glacier National Park (U.S.)
Lakes of Glacier County, Montana